George James Willshaw (18 October 1912 – September 1993) was an English professional footballer who played in the Football League for Bristol City, Southend United and Leyton Orient as an outside left.

Personal life 
Willshaw served in the British Armed Forces during the Second World War.

Career statistics

References 

English Football League players
Leyton Orient F.C. players
English footballers
Association football outside forwards
People from Hackney, London
1912 births
1993 deaths
Southall F.C. players
Walthamstow Avenue F.C. players
Southend United F.C. players
Bristol City F.C. players
Margate F.C. players
British military personnel of World War II